The 1984 United States Senate election in Kansas was held on November 6, 1984. 

Incumbent Senator Nancy Kassebaum was re-elected to a second term in office.

Republican primary

Candidates
 Nancy Kassebaum, incumbent Senator

Results
Senator Kassebaum was unopposed for renomination by the Republican Party.

Democratic primary

Candidates
 James R. Maher, financial consultant and Conservative Party nominee for Senate in 1978

Results
Maher was unopposed for the Democratic nomination.

Independents and third parties

American
 Marian Ruck Jackson, nominee for Lt. Governor in 1978 and 1982

Conservative
 Lucille Bieger, resident of Russell

Libertarian
 Douglas N. Merritt, resident of Atchison

Prohibition
 Freda H. Steele, resident of Alta Vista

General election

Results

See also 
 1984 United States Senate elections

References 

1984
Kansas
United States Senate